"Liberian Girl" is the ninth single released from American singer Michael Jackson's 1987 album Bad. The song was written as early as 1983 and was among those considered for the Jacksons' Victory album. It was reworked and rewritten for Bad. The song was released as a single in Europe, Japan, New Zealand, and Australia. Although a commercial success (ranking the Top 15 in several countries), the song was never performed live by Michael Jackson during his Bad World Tour or later concerts.

Critical reception
The New York Times editor Jon Pareles wrote that a melody line from "Billie Jean" reappears in this song. Rolling Stones Davitt Sigerson praised the song: "'Liberian Girl' "is Michael's filler, which makes it richer, sexier, better than Thriller's forgettables" and he also described that it "glistens with gratitude for the existence of a loved one." In 2003, Q magazine ranked the song at number 1,001 in their list of the "1001 Best Songs Ever".

Reaction in Liberia
The song received a positive reception in Liberia, with women from the country viewing the song as empowering. Liberian woman Margaret Carson said in an interview with The Washington Times "When that music came out … the Liberian girls were so astonished to hear a great musician like Michael Jackson thinking about a little country in Africa. It gave us hope, especially when things went bad … . It made us to feel that we are still part of the world."

Music video
Directed by Jim Yukich and produced by Paul Flattery for FYI (Flattery Yukich Inc.), the video for the song was filmed in two days in April 1989 at A&M Chaplin Stage at A&M Studios in Los Angeles, California. The music video featured many of Jackson's celebrity friends who gather on a soundstage to film the music video for "Liberian Girl", only to discover that Jackson was filming them all along. The following people are listed in order of appearance (ordered by columns):

There was also someone dressed as a mummy in the video. In the ending credits the mummy was credited with a question mark.

The music video of the song was included on the video albums: HIStory on Film, Volume II, Vision and the Target version DVD of Bad 25.

Track listings
7-inch
 "Liberian Girl" (edit) – 3:40
 "Girlfriend" – 3:05

12-inch
 "Liberian Girl" (edit) – 3:40
 "Get on the Floor" – 4:44
 "Girlfriend" – 3:05

CD single
 "Liberian Girl" (edit) – 3:40
 "Girlfriend" – 3:05
 "The Lady in My Life" – 5:00
 "Get on the Floor" – 4:44

CD 3-inch
 "Liberian Girl" (edit) – 3:40
 "Get on the Floor" – 4:44
 "Girlfriend" – 3:05

Personnel
 Michael Jackson – Songwriter, co-producer, solo and background vocals, drums, rhythm arrangement, vocal arrangement
 Quincy Jones – Producer, rhythm arrangement, synthesizer arrangement
 John Barnes – Rhythm arrangement, vocal arrangement, synthesizer arrangement, synthesizers
 Michael Boddicker – Synthesizers
 Miko Brando – Drums
 Christopher Currell – Synclavier
 Paulinho da Costa – Percussion
 Douglas Getschal – Drum programming
 Jerry Hey – Synthesizer arrangement
 Letta Mbulu – Swahili chant
 David Paich – Synthesizers
 Steve Porcaro – Synthesizer programming
 John Robinson – Drums
 Caiphus Semenya – Swahili chant arrangement
 Larry Williams – Synthesizers

Charts

References

External links
 

1987 songs
1989 singles
1980s ballads
Michael Jackson songs
Songs written by Michael Jackson
Song recordings produced by Michael Jackson
Song recordings produced by Quincy Jones
Contemporary R&B ballads
Epic Records singles
CBS Records singles
Macaronic songs
Irish Singles Chart number-one singles
Fictional Liberian people